Itza may refer to:

 Itza people, an ethnic group of Guatemala
 Itzaʼ language, a Mayan language
 Itza Kingdom (disambiguation)
 Itza, Navarre, a town in Spain

See also 
 Chichen Itza, a Mayan city
 Iza (disambiguation)
 Izza (disambiguation)
 ITSA (disambiguation)

Language and nationality disambiguation pages